The following list is a complete collection of results for the England national rugby league team. England's matches against Australia and New Zealand show a limited number of matches played due to the fact that the Great Britain national rugby league team participated and represented England in tournaments such as World Cups and also tours in the 1900s, and early 2000s before their last fixture against New Zealand in 2007. For more information on this topic see: Great Britain national rugby league team results

All-time records

1900s

1910s

1920s

1930s

1940s

1950s

1960s

1970s

1980s

1990s

2000s

2010s

2020s

See also

References

External links
 Rugby League Hall Of Fame
 "From All Blacks To All Golds" by John Haynes
 "THE KIWIS – 100 Years of International Rugby League" by John Coffey and Bernie Wood
 "The Year The Kiwis Flew" by Peter Leitch and Richard Becht
 "The A–Z of Rugby League" by Malcolm Andrews
 Journal De L'Epoque
 Treize Magazine
 "Rugby League Bravehearts" by Gavin Willacy
 Rugby League International Scores
 Rugby League Project
 Heads, Ian and Middleton, David (2008) A Centenary of Rugby League, MacMillan Sydney

 Results
Rugby league-related lists
Lists of rugby league teams
British rugby league lists
Rugby league